Alessio Galletti (26 March 1968 – 15 June 2005) was an Italian racing cyclist. He died from heart failure while he was racing in the Subida al Naranco, 15 km from the finish line. He participated in all three of the Grand Tours of cycling.

Palmares

1996
10th G.P. Camaiore
10th Tre Valli Varesine
1998
2nd Overall Tour de l'Ain   
1st Stage 3 
2nd Overall Tour du Maroc
2000
10th G.P. Camaiore
2001
 1st Stage 3 Tour Down Under
2003
 1st GP Fred Mengoni
9th Coppa Bernocchi

References

External links 

1968 births
2005 deaths
Italian male cyclists
Cyclists who died while racing
Sportspeople from the Province of Pisa
Cyclists from Tuscany
Sport deaths in Spain
20th-century Italian people